A patent classification is a system for examiners of patent offices or other people to categorize (code) documents, such as published patent applications, according to the technical features of their content. Patent classifications make it feasible to search quickly for documents about earlier disclosures similar to or related to the invention for which a patent is applied for, and to track technological trends in patent applications.

Searches based on patent classifications can identify documents of different languages by using the codes (classes) of the system, rather than words. Patent classification systems were originally developed for sorting paper documents, but are nowadays used for searching patent databases.

The International Patent Classification (IPC) is agreed internationally. The United States Patent Classification (USPC) is fixed by the United States Patent and Trademark Office (USPTO). The Derwent classification system is fixed by an enterprise. The German Patent Classification (DPK) was fixed by the German Patent Office (Deutsches Patentamt).

In October 2010, the European Patent Office (EPO) and USPTO launched a joint project to create the Cooperative Patent Classification (CPC) in order to harmonise the patent classifications systems between the two offices. CPC from 2013 replaces the European Classification (ECLA), which was based on the IPC but adapted by the EPO.

See also 
 European Convention on the International Classification of Patents for Invention

External links 
 Patent classification by the British Library (archived page)
 Cooperative Patent Classification (CPC)